Newton Station may refer to:
Newton station (Kansas), an Amtrak station in Newton, Kansas, USA
Newton station (Mississippi), a historic train station in Newton, Mississippi, USA
Newton railway station, a railway station located between the town of Cambuslang and the village of Newton in Greater Glasgow, Scotland
Newton for Hyde railway station, serving the Newton area of Hyde in Greater Manchester, England
Newton Abbot railway station, serving the town of Newton Abbot in Devon, England
Newton MRT station, an underground Mass Rapid Transit station on the North South Line and Downtown Line in Singapore
Newton Corner station, known as Newton station from 1834-1959 on the Worcester Line.

See also
Newton (disambiguation)